Geerike  Schreurs (born 19 May 1989 in Zwolle) is a road cyclist from the Netherlands. She participated at the 2012 UCI Road World Championships in the Women's team time trial for the Sengers Ladies Cycling Team.

References

External links
 profile at procyclingstats.com

1989 births
Dutch female cyclists
Living people
Sportspeople from Zwolle
20th-century Dutch women
20th-century Dutch people
21st-century Dutch women
Cyclists from Overijssel